The 1933 Florida Gators football team represented the University of Florida during the 1933 college football season. The season was Florida alumnus Dennis K. Stanley's first as the head coach of the Florida Gators football team. Stanley, who had been a standout end on the great 1928 Gators team, assembled an all-Florida-alumni coaching staff and led the Gators to a 5–3–1 revival following two consecutive losing seasons in 1931 and 1932.

The 1933 season was also the first for the new Southeastern Conference (SEC), and Stanley's 1933 Florida Gators finished with a 2–3 SEC record and tied for ninth among the thirteen SEC charter members.

Before the season
Dutch Stanley was hired. Quarterback Sam Davis was the first quarterback and captain since Goof Bowyer in 1928. A star on the team was Al Hickland, a 250-pound, three-sport athlete who was also the team's kicker.

Schedule

Season summary
The highlights of the 1933 season included SEC wins over the Sewanee Tigers and Auburn Tigers, and out-of-conference victories versus the North Carolina Tar Heels and Maryland Terrapins.

References

Florida
Florida Gators football seasons
Florida Gators football